The Boston Early Music Festival (BEMF) is a non-profit organization founded in 1980 in Boston, Massachusetts, U.S. to promote historical music performance.  It presents an annual concert series in Boston and New York City, produces opera recordings, and organizes a weeklong Festival and Exhibition every two years in Boston. A centerpiece of these festivals has been a fully staged Baroque opera production.

One of BEMF's main goals is to unearth lesser-known Baroque operas, which are then performed by the world's leading musicians armed with the latest information on period singing, orchestral performance, costuming, dance, and staging at each biennial Festival. BEMF operas are led by the BEMF Artistic Directors Paul O’Dette and Stephen Stubbs, BEMF Orchestra Director Robert Mealy, and BEMF Opera Director Gilbert Blin. In 2008, BEMF introduced its Chamber Opera Series as part of its annual concert season. The series presents semi-staged productions of chamber operas composed during the Baroque period. In 2011, BEMF took its chamber production of Handel's Acis and Galatea on a four-city North-American tour. In 2004, BEMF initiated a project to record some of its work in the field of Baroque opera on the CPO recording label. The series has since earned five Grammy Award nominations, including a 2015 Grammy Award for Best Opera Recording.

At each Festival, concerts are presented every day from morning until late at night. Concerts are given by an array of established luminaries and rising stars in the field of early music worldwide. BEMF concerts also allow for unique, once-in-a-lifetime collaborations and programs by the spectacular array of talent assembled for the Festival week's events. In addition, there are many scheduled Fringe concerts and events, presented both by local and out-of-town groups at a number of venues in Boston and Cambridge. The Exhibition at the Festival is the largest event of its kind in the United States, showcasing over one hundred early instrument makers, music publishers, service organizations, schools and universities, and associated colleagues.

In 1989, BEMF established an annual concert series to meet the increasing demand for year-round performances of early music. BEMF then expanded its concert series in 2006, when it began presenting performances to New York City at The Morgan Library & Museum. BEMF's annual season now sets the bar nationally for early music performance and has featured such musicians as The Tallis Scholars, Jordi Savall and Hespèrion XXI, and Les Arts Florissants, as well as the North American débuts of Stile Antico, Bach Collegium Japan, Netherlands Bach Society, and Akademie für Alte Musik Berlin.

Operas staged

 King Arthur by Henry Purcell (1995)
 L’Orfeo by Luigi Rossi (1997)
 Ercole Amante by Francesco Cavalli (1999)
 Thésée by Jean-Baptiste Lully (2001)
 Ariadne by Johann Georg Conradi (2003)
 Boris Goudenow by Johann Mattheson (2005)
 Psyché by Jean-Baptiste Lully (2007)
 Venus and Adonis by John Blow (2008) 
 Actéon by Marc-Antoine Charpentier (2008)
 L'incoronazione di Poppea by Claudio Monteverdi (2009)
 Acis and Galatea by George Frideric Handel (2009)
 Dido and Aeneas by Henry Purcell (2010)
 Niobe, regina di Tebe by Agostino Steffani (2011)
 La descente d'Orphée aux enfers by Marc-Antoine Charpentier (2011)
 La couronne de fleurs by Marc-Antoine Charpentier (2011)
 L'Orfeo by Claudio Monteverdi (2012)
 Almira by George Frideric Handel (2013)
 La serva padrona by Giovanni Battista Pergolesi (2014)
 Livietta e Tracollo by Giovanni Battista Pergolesi (2014)
 Il ritorno d'Ulisse in patria by Claudio Monteverdi (2015)
 Les plaisirs de Versailles by Marc-Antoine Charpentier (2016)
 Les fontaines de Versailles by Michel Richard Delalande (2016)
 Le carnaval de Venise by Andre Campra (2017)
 La liberazione di Ruggiero by Francesca Caccini (2018)
 Orlando generoso by Agostino Steffani (2019)

References

External links

Classical music festivals in the United States
Early music festivals
Music festivals in Massachusetts
Festivals in Boston
Musical groups from Boston
1980 establishments in Massachusetts
Non-profit organizations based in Boston
Music festivals established in 1980
Performing arts in Massachusetts